Pentre-bach railway station is a railway station serving the villages of Pentrebach and Abercanaid in Merthyr Tydfil, Wales.  It is located on the Merthyr branch of the  Merthyr Line. Passenger services are provided by Transport for Wales.

The station was first opened by the Taff Vale Railway in 1886.

Services
On Sunday, there is a two-hourly service each way to Merthyr and Bridgend.

References

External links 

Railway stations in Merthyr Tydfil County Borough
DfT Category F2 stations
Former Taff Vale Railway stations
Railway stations in Great Britain opened in 1886
Railway stations served by Transport for Wales Rail